Kai Johansson (born 30 December 1969) is a Finnish swimmer. He competed in the men's 200 metre butterfly event at the 1992 Summer Olympics.

References

External links
 

1969 births
Living people
Finnish male butterfly swimmers
Olympic swimmers of Finland
Swimmers at the 1992 Summer Olympics
Swimmers from Helsinki